The Chihuahua or  is a Mexican breed of toy dog. It is named for the Mexican state of Chihuahua and is among the smallest of all dog breeds. It is usually kept as a companion animal or for showing.

History 

DNA studies suggest that native American dogs entered North America from Siberia roughly 10,000 years ago, and were then isolated for some 9000 years until the arrival of the first Europeans; these pre-contact dogs exhibited a unique genetic signature that is now almost gone. A study based on sequencing of ancient dog genomes, published in 2020, suggests that this pre-colonial ancestry survives in two Mexican breeds, to the extent of about 4% in the Chihuahua (and some 3% in the Xoloitzcuintli).

Colonial records refer to small, nearly hairless dogs at the beginning of the nineteenth century; one claims that sixteenth-century conquistadores found them plentiful in the region later known as Chihuahua. In a letter written in 1520, Hernan Cortés wrote that the Aztecs raised and sold little dogs as food.

The American Kennel Club first registered a Chihuahua in 1904, Midget, owned by H. Raynor of Texas.

Characteristics 

Chihuahuas are the smallest breed recognized by some kennel clubs. Current breed standards defined by registries specify an "apple-head" or "apple-dome" skull conformation. Chihuahuas occur in virtually any color combination, from solid to marked or splashed. Apple-dome Chihuahuas have large, round eyes and large, erect ears, set in a high, dramatically rounded skull. The stop is well defined, forming a near-90-degree angle where the muzzle meets the skull. Dogs of the older "deer" type, with a flat-topped head, more widely set eyes, larger ears, and longer, more slender legs, may still be registered, but the deer head is not considered a separate type in competition and a deer-head dog's digression from the breed standard is considered a fault.

Breed standards for this dog do not generally specify a height; only a weight and a description of their overall proportions.

A clause stating "if two dogs are equally good in type, the more diminutive one is preferred" was removed in 2009. 
The Fédération Cynologique Internationale standard calls for dogs ideally between 1.5 and 3.0 kg (3.3 and 6.6 lbs), although smaller ones are acceptable in the show ring.

Pet Chihuahuas (those bred or purchased as companions rather than as show dogs) often range above these weights, even above , if they have large bone structures or are allowed to become overweight. This does not mean that they are not purebred Chihuahuas; they just do not meet the requirements to enter a conformation show. Oversized Chihuahuas are seen in some of the best, and worst, bloodlines. Chihuahuas do not breed true for size, and puppies from the same litter can mature in drastically different sizes from one another. Also, larger breeding females are less likely to experience dystocia (obstructed labor). Many breeders try to breed Chihuahuas to be as small as possible, because those marketed as "teacup" or "tiny teacup" demand higher prices.

The Fédération Cynologique Internationale, which represents the major kennel clubs of 84 countries, disqualified the merle coat pattern, which appears mottled. In May 2007, The Kennel Club decided not to register puppies with this coloration due to the health risks associated with the responsible gene, and in December of that year, formally amended its breed standard to disqualify merle dogs.

Like many other small dogs, the Chihuahua may display above-average aggression toward people and other dogs.

Health 

The Chihuahua has some genetic predisposition to several neurological diseases, among them atlantoaxial instability, ceroid lipofuscinosis, congenital deafness, congenital hydrocephalus, muscular dystrophy, necrotizing meningoencephalitis, and  neuroaxonal dystrophy. In a radiographical study of canine periodontal disease in 2001, the Chihuahua was found to have the lowest incidence of the six breeds studied. The predisposition to medial patellar luxation is believed to be significant.

Additionally, the main cause of death in Chihuahua's has been found to be heart failure. The occurrence of heart failure is more likely to happen during their golden years. It has been noted that 75% of heart diseases has been due to valve deterioration. A valve, which regulates their blood flow, becomes deformed overtime. This deformity that increases over the years causes their blood to leak around the valve, which ultimately strains the heart and can be their cause of death.

A Chihuahua may be expected to live for twelve years or more.

Notes

References 

Companion dogs
Dog breeds originating from Indigenous Americans
Dog breeds originating in Mexico
FCI breeds
Mexican folklore
Toy dogs